Thomas or Tom Bartley may refer to:

Thomas W. Bartley (1812–1885), Democratic politician from the U.S. state of Ohio
Thomas Bartley (priest) (1926–2007), Roman Catholic priest and former Vicar General of the Diocese of Down and Connor
Thomas Bartley (cricket umpire) (1908–1964), English test cricket umpire
Thomas Bartley (footballer) (1874–1951), Glossop North End F.C. and Wales international footballer
Thomas Bartley (politician) (1798–1878), New Zealand politician